As Lions are a British alternative metal supergroup originating from London, England. The band was formed in 2015 by Austin Dickinson (son of Iron Maiden frontman Bruce Dickinson), Will Homer and Conor O'Keefe – all formerly of Rise to Remain. They have released one album, Selfish Age, and are signed to Better Noise. Their lead single, "Aftermath", has had success at US radio, reaching number 12 on both the Mediabase Active rock and Billboard Mainstream Rock charts. They have toured extensively with acts such as Shinedown, Five Finger Death Punch, Nothing More, Trivium and Alter Bridge.

Members
Austin Dickinson – lead vocals
Connor O'Keefe – lead guitar, keyboards
Will Homer – rhythm guitar
Stefan Whiting – bass
Dave Fee – drums

Discography

Albums
Selfish Age (2017)

Singles

Promotional singles
"The Suffering"
"White Flag"
"Pieces"
"One by One"
"The Fall"

Music videos

References

English hard rock musical groups